Prouty may refer to:

 George H. Prouty (1862–1918), U.S. politician
 Olive Higgins Prouty (1882–1974), U.S. novelist
 Winston L. Prouty (1906–1971), U.S. politician
 L. Fletcher Prouty (1917–2001), USAF colonel and writer
 Nada Nadim Prouty (born  1970), former US Government Intelligence Agent

See also

 Prouty Place State Park
 Prout (disambiguation)